Hollywood Whore may refer to:

 Hollywood Whore (Papa Roach song)
Hollywood Whore (Machine Gun Kelly song)